Clarence Henry Geist (1866 – June 12, 1938) was an American financier who played an important role in the early history of Boca Raton, Florida.

Biography
Clarence Geist was born and raised on a farm in LaPorte County, Indiana. When he was 18 he left Indiana and spent five years in the far West working in cattle ranching, but returned East when he realized he "could not make money where there wasn't any". He settled in Blue Island, Illinois and worked for a year on the Rock Island Railroad as a conductor, and subsequent to that entered the real estate business  and served as president of the Cottage Building and Loan in Blue Island. Geist then set himself up as a natural gas distributor, where he supplied gas to Blue Island, Morgan Park, then a suburb of Chicago, and Illinois suburbs south of Blue Island that included Harvey and Chicago Heights.

His wife was Florence Hewitt Geist. He walked with a cane and was an avid golfer, participating in tournaments. From 1912 to 1938 he was the principal owner of the Indianapolis Water Company. Geist Reservoir (1943) is named for him. He also founded in 1910 the company today known as South Jersey Industries, when the Atlantic City Gas and Water Company merged with Atlantic City Gas Company. He eventually owned over 100 utilities.

Geist was a friend of Charles G. Dawes, who in 1925 became Calvin Coolidge's Vice-President. Geist left Indiana first to work for the Dawes family in Chicago.

In 1924 he had built in Palm Beach La Claridad, a mansion designed by Palm Beach architect Marion Sims Wyeth, who also designed Mar-a-Lago. He was a member of the Everglades Club, and the mansion was built on the club grounds (which covered several blocks).

When Addison Mizner's Mizner Development Corporation went bankrupt in 1926 after trying to build the new resort of Boca Raton, Geist bought its assets in 1927 via an anonymous bid of $76,350. Included were the Cloister Inn, fifty houses, and 15,000 acres of land. He commissioned the New York architectural firm Schultze and Weaver to create an addition to the 100-room Cloister Inn, resulting in the 450-room Boca Raton Club, which accepted its first guests in December, 1929, ahead of its 1930 formal opening.

Geist made a low-interest loan to Boca Raton to finance its first municipal water plant (which he convinced Boca Raton it needed) and provide water for the guests at his new hotel. He built it in Mizner's style, for visual harmony. At the time, the handsome, Mediterranean-style plant was the most modern in the state. (It was replaced by a much larger plant in 1956, parts having become unavailable for the original equipment. The building was demolished and the site currently houses Boca's City Hall.) He also paid for an elegant, Mediterranean-style depot on the Florida East Coast Railway (in 2017 operated by the Boca Raton Historical Society as a museum). Geist allegedly bought stock in the railroad in order to influence its choice of Boca Raton depot.

He died at his home in Villanova, Pennsylvania on June 12, 1938 and was interred at West Laurel Hill Cemetery in Bala Cynwyd, Pennsylvania. At the time of his death it was reported at one time that Geist was reputed to be worth $100,000,000 ($1.93 billion in 2021)

Legacy
The bridge over the Intracoastal Waterway on Mizner's Camino Real is officially the Clarence H. Geist Memorial Bridge (1939), replacing a temporary swing bridge built by Geist.

A Clarence H. Geist Memorial Organ (1940) is located at the Overbrook Memorial Church in Overbrook, New Jersey. Geist was the founder and owner of the New Jersey Seaview Country Club (1914). He was on the Board of the Lehigh Coal and Navigation Company at the time of his death. He owned a Philadelphia Main Line mansion.

References

1866 births
1938 deaths
American financiers
People from Palm Beach, Florida
People from Boca Raton, Florida
American hoteliers
Addison Mizner
Businesspeople from Indianapolis
Businesspeople from Florida
Businesspeople from Philadelphia
People from LaPorte County, Indiana
Water supply and sanitation in the United States
Philadelphia Main Line
People from Blue Island, Illinois